The women's shot put event at the 2015 European Athletics U23 Championships was held in Tallinn, Estonia, at Kadriorg Stadium on 9 July.

Medalists

Results

Final
9 July

Qualifications
9 July

Participation
According to an unofficial count, 23 athletes from 19 countries participated in the event.

References

Shot put
Shot put at the European Athletics U23 Championships